Václav Varaďa (born April 26, 1976) is a Czech former professional ice hockey player and current coach. He formerly played in the National Hockey League (NHL) in a ten-year span. In his professional career, he has previously played for the Buffalo Sabres and the Ottawa Senators. Varaďa was known for his physicality in a third or fourth line role.

Playing career 
Varaďa spent his young years with the Czech League from 1992 to 1994, and that year he became drafted. To get closer to earn a spot in the NHL, Varaďa moved up to the Western Hockey League (WHL), and then the NHL's affiliate, the American Hockey League (AHL). He was traded to the Buffalo Sabres in a deal for Doug Bodger, to Varaďa's original team, the San Jose Sharks. Rotating from the AHL for a few years, he created a reputation as a pest and a solid checking line player.

He played some of his best hockey for the Buffalo Sabres during their trip to the Stanley Cup finals amassing 24 assists, three shy of his professional career. Despite the large help of Dominik Hašek, the Sabres lost to the Dallas Stars in six games by a controversial goal by winger Brett Hull.

He was later traded to the Ottawa Senators for Jakub Klepiš before the 2003 trade deadline in an attempt by the Senators to become a tougher and gritty team, en route to the Senators' first Eastern Conference championship series against the defensive-minded team, New Jersey Devils. In a dramatic seven game series, New Jersey came out on top to eventually win the Stanley Cup.

After spending his career with the Vítkovice of the Czech League during the 2004–05 NHL lockout, Varaďa spent one more year with the Senators. In a game against the Toronto Maple Leafs, Varaďa was ready to check defenceman Carlo Colaiacovo skating down to the Senators' end. Varaďa collided with him, then Colaiacovo spun into the boards, hard enough for a concussion. After taken off by a stretcher, there were fans complaining about an intent to injure, especially with Colaiacovo's history of serious injuries. However, video has shown Colaiacovo was skating hard enough to actually rebound off Varaďa.

Once the playoffs came for the heavily-favoured Senators, the team fell to the Sabres in a five-game series, with Varaďa only totaling two assists. In August 2006, Varaďa signed with HC Davos of the Swiss National League A (NLA).

Career statistics

Regular season and playoffs

International

External links 

 Current Stats
 
 

1976 births
Living people
Buffalo Sabres players
Czech ice hockey right wingers
HC Davos players
HC Kometa Brno players
HC Oceláři Třinec players
HC Slovan Ústečtí Lvi players
HC Vítkovice players
Kelowna Rockets players
Ottawa Senators players
People from Vsetín
Rochester Americans players
San Jose Sharks draft picks
SCL Tigers players
Tacoma Rockets players
Czech ice hockey coaches
Sportspeople from the Zlín Region
Czechoslovak ice hockey right wingers
Czech expatriate ice hockey players in the United States
Czech expatriate ice hockey players in Canada
Czech expatriate ice hockey players in Switzerland